Edvards Smiltens is a Latvian politician. He is the current Speaker of the Saeima.

Early life and education
Smiltens was born in 1984 in Riga, Latvia. He received his early education from Riga French Lyceum. Later, he attended the University of Latvia, where he earned a bachelor's degree in social sciences in law.

Career
In November 2010, Smilten was elected as a member of the Saeima. In November 2022, Smilten was elected as the Speaker of the Saeima.

References

1984 births
Living people
21st-century Latvian politicians
Speakers of the Saeima
Politicians from Riga
University of Latvia alumni